This is a list of electoral district results for the 1989 Queensland state election.

Results by electoral district

Albert

Archerfield

Ashgrove

Aspley

Auburn

Balonne

Barambah

Barron River

Bowen

Brisbane Central

Broadsound

Bulimba

Bundaberg

Burdekin

Burnett

Caboolture

Cairns

Callide

Carnarvon

Chatsworth

Condamine

Cook

Cooroora

Cunningham 

The two party preferred vote was not counted between the National and Liberal candidates for Cunningham.

Currumbin

Everton

Fassifern

Flinders

Glass House

Greenslopes

Gregory

Gympie

Hinchinbrook

Ipswich

Ipswich West

Isis

Landsborough

By-election 

 This by-election was caused by the resignation of Mike Ahern. It was held on 28 July 1990.

Lockyer

Logan

Lytton

Mackay

Manly

Mansfield

Maryborough

Merthyr

Mirani

Moggill

Mount Coot-tha

Mount Gravatt

Mount Isa

Mourilyan

Mulgrave

Murrumba

Nerang

Nicklin 

 The court declared the 1989 election result void. Instead of a by-election, the ballot papers were recounted and the National Party candidate was declared the winner on the preference count.

Nudgee

Nundah

By-election 

 This by-election was caused by the resignation of Phil Heath. It was held on 18 May 1991.

Peak Downs

Pine Rivers

Port Curtis

Redcliffe

Redlands

Rockhampton

Rockhampton North

Roma

Salisbury

Sandgate

Sherwood

By-election 

 This by-election was caused by the resignation of Angus Innes. It was held on 28 July 1990.

 Preferences were not distributed.

Somerset

South Brisbane

South Coast

Southport

Springwood

Stafford

Surfers Paradise

Tablelands

Thuringowa

Toowong

Toowoomba North

Toowoomba South

By-election 

 This by-election was caused by the resignation of Clive Berghofer, who was prohibited from serving as an MLA while Mayor of Toowoomba due to a change in legislation. It was held on 18 May 1991.

Townsville

Townsville East

Warrego

Warwick

Whitsunday

Windsor

Wolston

Woodridge

Yeronga

See also 

 1989 Queensland state election
 Members of the Queensland Legislative Assembly, 1986–1989
 Members of the Queensland Legislative Assembly, 1989–1992
 Candidates of the Queensland state election, 1989

References 

Results of Queensland elections